Staffordshire 2 was a tier 10 English Rugby Union league with teams from Staffordshire taking part.  Promoted teams moved up to Staffordshire 1 and there was no relegation.  Staffordshire 2 was cancelled at the end of the 2003–04 season and all teams transferred into Staffordshire 1.

Original teams

When league rugby began in 1987 this division contained the following teams:

Cheadle
Eccleshall
GEC St Leonards
Michelin
Old Oaks
Rubery Owen
St Matthews
Uttoxeter
Wheaton Aston & Penkridge

Staffordshire 2 honours

Staffordshire 1 (1987–1992)

The original Staffordshire 2 was a tier 10 league with promotion up to Staffordshire 1 and no relegation.  At the end of the 1991–92 season the merging of all Staffordshire and Warwickshire leagues meant that Staffordshire 2 was discontinued for the years that these leagues were active.

Staffordshire 2 (1999–2000)

At the end of the 1998–99 season Staffordshire 2 was reintroduced as a level 11 league following the splitting of Staffordshire into two divisions.  Promotion was to Staffordshire 1 and there was no relegation.

Staffordshire 1 (2000–2005)

The cancellation of Staffordshire/Warwickshire 1 would see Staffordshire 2 become a tier 10 league.  Promotion was to Staffordshire 1 and there was no relegation.  At the end of the 2003–04 season Staffordshire 2 was cancelled and all teams transferred Staffordshire 1.

Number of league titles

Rugeley (3)
Eccleshall (2)
Cannock (1)
Rubery Owen (1)
Uttoxeter (1)
Wednesbury (1)
Whittington (1)

Notes

See also
Staffordshire 1
Midlands RFU
Staffordshire RU
English rugby union system
Rugby union in England

References

9
Rugby union in Staffordshire